Ada Karmi-Melamede (born 1936) is a noted Israeli architect.

Biography 
Karmi-Melamede was born on December 24, 1936, in Tel Aviv, in Mandate Palestine (now Israel).

She studied at the Architectural Association School of Architecture in London from 1956 to 1959 and at the Technion – Israel Institute of Technology from 1961 to 1962, being awarded her degree in 1963.
She has taught extensively in the United States, first at Columbia and then at Yale and Penn.

In 1986 she and her brother Ram Karmi won an international competition to design the Supreme Court of Israel compound, which opened in 1992. The New York Times architecture critic Paul Goldberger wrote of the design, "the sharpness of the Mediterranean architectural tradition and the dignity of the law are here married with remarkable grace."

Awards 
 In 2007, Karmi-Melamede was awarded the Israel Prize, for architecture. Her father, Dov Karmi, had received the same prize in 1957, and her brother Ram Karmi in 2002.
 Awarded the Sandberg Prize

See also 
List of Israel Prize recipients

References 

Israeli architects
Technion – Israel Institute of Technology alumni
Israel Prize in architecture recipients
Israel Prize women recipients
Sandberg Prize recipients
Israeli people of Ukrainian-Jewish descent
Israeli Jews
People from Tel Aviv
1936 births
Living people
Israeli women architects